Several heritage trails have been designed in Hong Kong:

Trails designed by the Antiquities and Monuments Office of the Leisure and Cultural Services Department:
 Ping Shan Heritage Trail, in Yuen Long District, opened on 12 December 1993
 Lung Yeuk Tau Heritage Trail
 Central and Western Heritage Trail

Other trails include
 Dr Sun Yat-sen Historical Trail, in Central and Western District.
 Hong Kong Boulder Trackways
 St Stephen's College Heritage Trail
 Tai Tam Waterworks Heritage Trail
 Wan Chai Heritage Trail, launched on 27 September 2009

Military history trails
 Pinewood Battery Heritage Trail, within the Lung Fu Shan Country Park
 Shing Mun War Relics Trail
 Wong Nai Chung Gap Trail, opened in 2006

See also

 List of hiking trails in Hong Kong
 List of buildings and structures in Hong Kong
 Heritage conservation in Hong Kong
 Declared monuments of Hong Kong
 List of Grade I historic buildings in Hong Kong
 List of Grade II historic buildings in Hong Kong
 List of Grade III historic buildings in Hong Kong
 History of Hong Kong

References

External links

 Heritage Trails on the Antiquities and Monuments Office website
 Shing Mun War Relics Trail
 Hong Kong Boulder Trackways' Survey
 

Heritage conservation in Hong Kong
Monuments and memorials in Hong Kong
Urban heritage trails